Bernard Viot (9 August 1937 – 27 November 2022) was a French professional racing cyclist. He rode in three editions of the Tour de France.

Viot died on 27 November 2022, at the age of 85.

References

External links
 

1937 births
2022 deaths
French male cyclists